JM-1232 is a sedative and hypnotic drug being researched as a potential anesthetic. It has similar effects to sedative-hypnotic benzodiazepine drugs, but is structurally distinct and so is classed as a nonbenzodiazepine hypnotic. It was developed by a team at Maruishi Pharmaceutica.

A human study explored the sedation caused by infusions at a range of doses, finding a fair hemodynamic safety profile.

References 

Sedatives
General anesthetics
GABAA receptor positive allosteric modulators
Experimental drugs